Scythrididae (flower moths) is a family of small moths in the superfamily Gelechioidea. The family is sometimes included in the Xyloryctidae as a subfamily Scythridinae, but the Xyloryctidae themselves have sometimes been included in the Oecophoridae as subfamily. Scythrididae adults are smallish to mid-sized moths, which when at rest appear teardrop-shaped.

Selected genera
Genera of Scythrididae (with some notable species also listed) include:

 Apostibes Walsingham, 1907
 Areniscythris Powell, 1976
 Asymmetrura Landry, 1991
 Bactrianoscythris Passerin d'Entrèves & Roggero, 2009
 Catascythris
 Coleophorides Amsel, 1935
 Enolmis Duponchel, 1845
 Episcythris Amsel, 1939
 Eretmocera Zeller, 1852
 Erigethes Walsingham, 1907
 Falkovitshella Passerin d'Entrèves & Roggero, 2007
 Haploscythris Viette, 1956
 Mapsidius Walsingham, 1907
 Necrothalassia Amsel, 1935
 Neoscythris Landry, 1991
 Paralogistis Meyrick, 1921
 Parascythris Hanneman, 1960
 Proterochyta Meyrick, 1918
 Rhamphura Landry, 1991
 Scythris Hübner, [1825]
 Scythris limbella
 Scythris scopolella
 Synacroloxis Gozmány, 1952

Footnotes

References

 See also Gelechioidea Talk page for comparison of some approaches to gelechioid systematics and taxonomy.
  (2004): Scythris buszkoi sp. n., a new species of Scythrididae from Europe (Gelechioidea). Nota Lepidopterologica 26(3/4): 89-98. PDF fulltext
  (1999): The Gelechioidea. In: : Handbuch der Zoologie/Handbook of Zoology (Vol. IV Part 35: Lepidoptera, Moths and Butterflies 1): 131–158. Walter de Gruyter, Berlin & New York.
  (2004): Markku Savela's Lepidoptera and some other life forms – Scythrididae. Version of 2004-JAN-02. Retrieved 2010-APR-22.
  (2009): Gelechioidea. Version of 2009-APR-02. Retrieved 2010-APR-22.

Further reading
 

 
Moth families